Hilarographa jonesi , the psychedelic Jones moth, is a species of moth of the family Tortricidae. It is found in the United States from Massachusetts south to Florida and west to Louisiana. The habitat consists of pine forests.

The wingspan is about 12–14 mm. Adults have a striking red and orange color pattern.

Etymology
The species is named in honor of Dr. F. M. Jones, who collected specimens of this species.

References

Moths described in 1953
Hilarographini